Persimer stand for Persatuan Sepak Bola Indonesia Merauke (English: Football Association of Indonesia Merauke) is an Indonesian football club based in Merauke Regency, South Papua, Indonesia. Club played in Liga 3.

Honours
Liga 3 Papua
3rd place: 2021

References

External links
Liga-Indonesia.co.id

Football clubs in Indonesia
Football clubs in South Papua
Merauke